Back from the Abyss is the eighth studio album by British heavy metal band Orange Goblin.  It was recorded at The Animal Farm (London), and it was released on 6 October 2014 in Europe and 7 October 2014 in the United States under the label Candlelight Records. The album received positive reviews from Blabbermouth and Metal Injection.

Track listing 
 "Sabbath Hex" – 4:47
 "Übermensch" – 3:57
 "The Devil's Whip" – 2:15
 "Demon Blues" – 4:40
 "Heavy Lies the Crown" – 6:19
 "Into the Arms of Morpheus" – 7:07
 "Mythical Knives" – 4:48
 "Bloodzilla" – 4:10
 "The Abyss" – 5:33
 "Titan" – 1:59
 "Blood of Them" – 5:47
 "The Shadow Over Innsmouth" – 2:53

Personnel 
 Ben Ward – vocals
 Joe Hoare – guitar
 Chris Turner – drums
 Martyn Millard – bass

References 

2014 albums
Orange Goblin albums
Candlelight Records albums